Jim Courier defeated Guy Forget in the final, 4–6, 6–3, 4–6, 6–3, 7–6(7–4) to win the men's singles tennis title at the 1991 Indian Wells Masters.

Stefan Edberg was the defending champion, but lost to Forget in the semifinals.

Seeds
The top eight seeds receive a bye into the second round.

Draw

Finals

Section 1

Section 2

Section 3

Section 4

References
 Singles Draw

Newsweek Champions Cup - Singles